The Atef Sedki governed Egypt through three cabinets under president Hosni Mubarak between 1986 and 1996.

List of members

References

Cabinets of Egypt
1986 establishments in Egypt
1996 disestablishments in Egypt
Cabinets established in 1986
Cabinets disestablished in 1996